"The Wild Hunt" is the 12th episode of season 3 of the supernatural drama television series Grimm  and the 56th episode overall, which premiered on January 24, 2014, on the cable network NBC. The episode was written by series creators Jim Kouf and David Greenwalt, and was directed by Rob Bailey.

Plot
Opening quote: "Come back in the evening, I'll have the door locked to keep out the wild huntsmen."

After dinner in a restaurant, Monroe (Silas Weir Mitchell) shows Rosalee (Bree Turner) something in the clock: an engagement ring. He proposes to Rosalee and she accepts. Meanwhile, a police officer pursues a car in a chase and finally catches up with it but the driver is nowhere to be found and the officer is scalped by a creature.

Monroe and Rosalee begin discussing telling Monroe's parents about their engagement, something which worries Monroe as he didn't tell them she is a Fuchsbau.

Reception

Viewers
The episode was viewed by 5.88 million people, earning a 1.5/5 in the 18-49 rating demographics on the Nielson ratings scale, ranking second on its timeslot and fourth for the night in the 18-49 demographics, behind Bones, 20/20, and Shark Tank. This was a 2% increase in viewership from the previous episode, which was watched by 5.71 million viewers with a 1.5/5. This means that 1.5 percent of all households with televisions watched the episode, while 5 percent of all households watching television at that time watched it. With DVR factoring in, the episode was watched by 8.77 million viewers with a 2.6 ratings share in the 18-49 demographics.

Critical reviews
"The Wild Hunt" received positive reviews. The A.V. Club's Kevin McFarland gave the episode a "B" grade and wrote, "Well, that certainly wasn't the kind of cliffhanger I was expecting heading into the Olympics hiatus. Grimm has used a playful, comedic title card immediately after a cliffhanger before. I remember at least one of the season finales doing the same thing. The gleefully shocked reaction on the title card — 'OH %&$*,' basically — suited the situation in the last 30 seconds of the episode, with Monroe's parents going full woge to attack Nick and Monroe trying to peacefully intervene. But that shift clashed dramatically with the lengthy and excruciating confrontation between Rosalee and Monroe's parents. Last week, Monrosalee visited the Fuchsbau side in supporting plot, but tonight, the couple is the main focus, leading to a few squeal-worthy moments and then one painfully overwrought climactic event."

Nick McHatton from TV Fanatic, gave a 4.0 star rating out of 5, stating: "As all good Grimm episodes are likely to do, Grimm Season 3 Episode 12 ended with the 'To be continued...' card. The biggest development was Monroe finally popping the question to Rosalee! It was quite adorable and imaginative - proposing with a cuckoo clock - and it fit Monroe's character so well."

MaryAnn Sleasman from TV.com, wrote, "For a season that has reveled in contrasting the Wesen world with the human world and the modern Wesen world with the traditional one, I'm delighted to bring one of our main couples into the forefront of that storyline. At the end of the day, I fall into Monroe's mindset, where it's really none of Mom and Dad's *&^%$#@! business, but in the meantime, exploring Wesen culture and family dynamics on such a personal level has the potential to be really great."

References

External links
 

Grimm (season 3) episodes
2014 American television episodes
Television episodes written by David Greenwalt